Wynton McManis (born September 20, 1994) is a gridiron football linebacker for the Toronto Argonauts of the Canadian Football League (CFL). He played college football at University of Memphis and was signed by the San Francisco 49ers as an undrafted free agent in 2016.

Professional career

San Francisco 49ers
On May 12, 2016, the San Francisco 49ers signed McManis as an undrafted free agent following the 2016 NFL Draft. He was released on August 27, 2016 and was signed to the practice squad on November 29, 2016. On December 23, 2016, the 49ers promoted McManis to their active roster from their practice squad after placing Torrey Smith on injured-reserve. He made his professional debut the following day in a 22–21 victory over the Los Angeles Rams. On May 2, 2017, McManis was waived by the 49ers.

Calgary Stampeders
McManis signed with the Calgary Stampeders on June 17, 2017. After the CFL canceled the 2020 season due to the COVID-19 pandemic, McManis chose to opt-out of his contract with the Stampeders.

New Orleans Saints 
McManis was signed by the New Orleans Saints on August 29, 2020. He was waived on September 5, 2020. On January 20, 2021, McManis signed a reserve/futures contract with the Saints. He was waived on August 31, 2021 and re-signed to the practice squad. He was released on September 6. McManis resigned with the Saints' practice squad on September 15, 2021, and was elevated to the 53 man roster on September 18, 2021. He was released on September 20, 2021 and re-signed to the practice squad. He was released on October 12.

Miami Dolphins
On November 24, 2021, McManis was signed to the Miami Dolphins practice squad.

Toronto Argonauts
On February 8, 2022, it was announced that McManis had signed with the Toronto Argonauts.

References

External links
 Toronto Argonauts bio

Living people
1994 births
American football linebackers
American players of Canadian football
Calgary Stampeders players
Canadian football linebackers
Memphis Tigers football players
Miami Dolphins players
New Orleans Saints players
People from Olive Branch, Mississippi
Players of American football from Memphis, Tennessee
Players of Canadian football from Memphis, Tennessee
San Francisco 49ers players
Toronto Argonauts players